Black Diamond was a buffalo or North American bison, housed at Central Park Menagerie (Central Park Zoo); according to legend, it was the model for the US buffalo nickel coin introduced in 1913, designed and sculpted by American sculptor James Earle Fraser in 1911.

Black Diamond was born in 1893 of a bull and cow given to the zoo by Barnum and Bailey. He weighed 1550 pounds (ultimately yielding 750 pounds of usable meat), and was a popular attraction at the zoo.

Sick and disabled at age 22, Black Diamond was put up for auction June 28, 1915. However, no bids were received. It was purchased for slaughter in a private sale for $300 (equal to $ today) by A. Silz, inc., a game and poultry dealer. It was slaughtered November 17 and "Black Diamond Steaks" were sold for $2 a pound, equal to $ today. Fred Santer, a New York taxidermist, mounted Black Diamond's head and turned its hide into a then-fashionable 13-foot automobile robe.

In the April 1952 issue of Natural History magazine, George S. Goodwin, the Associate Curator of Mammals at the Museum of Natural History, wrote "(Black Diamond) was an excellent object for the artistic brush. ... Despite his size, he was quite docile. This virtue made him the perfect model." However, James Fraser never said that Black Diamond had been his model, and the Bureau of the Mint has doubts as to whether any specific bison was Fraser's model, their argument being that Fraser would have been well familiar with the species already.

It is also reported to have been the model for the obverse (face) of the $10 U.S. Banknote, Series 1901.

References

Individual bovines
1893 animal births
Individual animals in the United States